George Donaldson may refer to:

 George Donaldson (musician), (1968—2014), Scottish musician and a member of Irish singing group Celtic Thunder
 George Donaldson (footballer), (born 1954) Scottish footballer with Rangers and Hearts